At the End of the Day: The Sue Rodriguez Story is a 1998 Canadian television film about the life of Canadian right to die advocate Sue Rodriguez.

The film was written by Linda Svendsen based on the book by Lisa Hobbs Birnie and directed by Sheldon Larry.

Cast

Politician Svend Robinson was portrayed by a different actor, but also had his own cameo role in the film as the third reporter at Sue Rodriguez's first press conference.

Awards
 In 1999 Wendy Crewson won the Best Performance by an Actress in a Leading Role in a Dramatic Program or Mini-Series at the Gemini Awards
 In 1999 Linda Svendsen won the WGC Award from the Writers Guild of Canada

References

External links
 
 

1998 films
English-language Canadian films
Canadian drama television films
1990s biographical drama films
Canadian biographical drama films
Films scored by Andrew Lockington
Films scored by Mychael Danna
Amyotrophic lateral sclerosis
1998 drama films
1990s English-language films
Films directed by Sheldon Larry
Canadian films based on actual events
1990s Canadian films